Chovvakkaran Shahid (born 8 February 1983) is an Indian first-class cricketer who plays for Kerala. He made his first-class debut for Kerala against Goa on November 24, 2012 in the 2012-13 Ranji Trophy. He made his List A debut for Kerala against Hyderabad in the 2012-13 Vijay Hazare Trophy.

References

External links
 

1983 births
Living people
Indian cricketers
Kerala cricketers
People from Thalassery
Cricketers from Kerala